Graeme C. Hays (born 1966) is a British and Australian marine ecologist known for his work with sea turtles and plankton. He is the Alfred Deakin Professor of Marine Science at Deakin University, Australia.
 
He was born in Nairobi, Kenya and works in the area of marine ecology researching animal movements and impacts of climate change. His work has helped reveal navigational abilities of sea turtles., the impact of global warming on sea turtles and the factors controlling zooplankton diel vertical migration, the largest animal migration on Earth.

Hays has been named one of the most highly cited scientists in the field of marine biology.

Career
Hays gained a PhD in physiological ecology in 1991 under the mentorship of John Speakman FRS at the University of Aberdeen. He worked at the Sir Alister Hardy Foundation for Ocean Science and Bangor University, Wales before becoming a lecturer at Swansea University in 1996, becoming a Professor in 2005. He became Professor of Marine Science at Deakin University in Australia in 2013.

He served on numerous journal editorial boards and from 2005 to 2013 he was Executive Editor of the British Ecological Society's Journal of Animal Ecology.

Recognition
In recognition of his research, he was made an Alfred Deakin Professor in 2014, the most prestigious honour that Deakin University bestows on its staff.

According to the 2020 science-wide standardized citation indicator, developed by Stanford University academic John P.A. Ioannidis and colleagues, Hays was listed in the top 30 most cited marine biologists in the world.

His research expedition to Ascension Island in 1997 for satellite tracking studies of green turtles to examine questions of turtle navigation first posed by Charles Darwin, became the subject of a best-selling book Turtle Island: A Visit To Britain’s Oddest Colony by Sergio Ghione.

Two first-day issues of postage stamps have been dedicated to his research on sea turtles.

In 2022 Hays received the Scopus Outstanding Researcher Award (Australia & New Zealand) for Excellence in Research Impacting a Sustainable Future. The award recognised his research that "Uses satellite tracking to reveal the movements and patterns of habitat use by marine animals and highlights the threats of climate change for sea turtles".

Research work

Sea turtle satellite tracking
In 1990 he conducted one of the first satellite tracking studies of sea turtles and subsequently used this approach to assess their navigational abilities, including at-sea experiments, and to reveal how ocean currents affect movements and so influence migration patterns.

Leading international review teams he has shown how satellite tracking can be widely used, across diverse animal taxa, to understand movement patterns and drive successful conservation outcomes for endangered species.

His research has developed methods to assess how climate warming is affecting the temperature-dependent sex ratios of sea turtle hatchlings and the likely impacts of population feminisation.

Recent research also shows how the long-distance movements of sea turtles can take them outside of even the largest marine reserves and into ocean areas with no protection from poaching or fishing gear entanglements, raising conservation concerns.

Plankton long-term changes and diel vertical migration
Hays’ research has provided some of the key evidence for understanding that predator-evasion underpins zooplankton diel vertical migrations, which is the largest animal migration (by biomass) on the planet.

He has also showed how phytoplankton and zooplankton phenology, range changes and abundance are being dramatically altered by climate change including major shifts in species composition.

Media
Hays’ research has received media coverage including in Science, Nature and the Australian Broadcasting Corporation (ABC).

References 

1966 births
Living people
British ecologists
Academic staff of Deakin University
Alumni of the University of Southampton